Our God and Our God and Lord refers to God. It is also one of the Names of God in Christianity.

It may also refer to:

"Our God" (song), a contemporary Christian song written by Chris Tomlin, Jesse Reeves, Jonas Myrin, and Matt Redman
"How Great Is Our God", a contemporary Christian song written by Chris Tomlin, Jesse Reeves and Ed Cash
This Is Our God, live album in the praise and worship series of contemporary worship music by Hillsong Church

See also
Our God, Our Help in Ages Past, a hymn by Isaac Watts paraphrasing the 90th Psalm of the Book of Psalms
Our God Saves, 2007 album of Paul Baloche
"Our God Reigns", a Christian contemporary song by Christian-alternative rock musician Brandon Heath from his first studio album, Don't Get Comfortable